The 2017 European Under-23 Baseball Championship was an international baseball tournament held by the Confederation of European Baseball for players 23-year-old and younger. The 2017 edition was be held in Austria (Wels), Czech Republic (Blansko and Brno) and Slovakia (Trnava). The Dutch team won the first ever edition.

Group stage

Pool A

Standings

Game Results

|}

Pool B

Standings

Game Results

|}

Pool C

Standings

Game Results

|}

Pool D

Standings

Game Results

|}

Second stage

Pool E (9º-12º)

Standings

Game Results

|}

Pool F (13º-16º)

Standings

Game Results

|}

Quarter-finals

5th-8th Places

Semi-finals

3rd-place game

Final

Final standings

Statistics leaders

Batting

* Minimum 1.0 AB per team game

Pitching

* Minimum 1.5 inning pitched per team game

External links
CEB Website

European Under-23 Baseball Championship
European Under-23 Baseball Championship
European Under-23 Baseball Championship
European Under-23 Baseball Championship